Giambattista Morea (22 September 1640 – 11 December 1711) was a Roman Catholic prelate who served as Bishop of Lacedonia (1684–1711).

Biography
Giambattista Morea was born in Bitonto, Italy on 22 September 1640. On 2 October 1684, he was appointed during the papacy of Pope Innocent XI as Bishop of Lacedonia. On 8 October 1684, he was consecrated bishop by Alessandro Crescenzi (cardinal), Cardinal-Priest of Santa Prisca, with Pier Antonio Capobianco, Bishop Emeritus of Lacedonia, and Benedetto Bartolo, Bishop of Belcastro, serving as co-consecrators. He served as Bishop of Lacedonia until his death on 11 December 1711.

References

External links and additional sources
 (for Chronology of Bishops) 
 (for Chronology of Bishops) 

17th-century Italian Roman Catholic bishops
18th-century Italian Roman Catholic bishops
Bishops appointed by Pope Innocent XI
1640 births
1711 deaths